Marián Dirnbach (born 13 September 1979 in Bratislava) is a retired Slovak football striker. He played for a number of clubs, including Nitra, Trenčín, Ružomberok, and Inter Bratislava. Dirnbach was capped three times by the Slovakia national football team.

In a match-fixing case, the FIFA confirmed a 25-year-ban on January 28, 2014. Marián Dirnbach may not play professional football in any country worldwide for that period of time.

References

External links

1979 births
Living people
Footballers from Bratislava
Slovak footballers
Slovakia international footballers
Skonto FC players
Expatriate footballers in Latvia
Expatriate footballers in Uzbekistan
FK Inter Bratislava players
Czech First League players
FK Viktoria Žižkov players
FK Chmel Blšany players
MFK Ružomberok players
Spartak Myjava players
FC Nasaf players
Slovak expatriate sportspeople in Latvia
Slovak expatriate sportspeople in Uzbekistan
Slovak Super Liga players
AS Trenčín players
FC Nitra players
FC Baník Prievidza players
Association football forwards
Slovak expatriate footballers
Slovakia youth international footballers
Slovak expatriate sportspeople in the Czech Republic
Expatriate footballers in the Czech Republic
Match fixers